Tsui Wang Kit (born 5 January 1997) is a Hong Kong professional footballer who currently plays as a fullback for Hong Kong Premier League club Lee Man.

Club career
On 10 January 2018, Tsui transferred to China League One side Meizhou Hakka. According to the rules of the Chinese football league, he is deemed as a native player.

On 1 May 2020, Meizhou Hakka agreed to a swap with R&F for Leung Nok Hang. Tsui revealed to the media that he his contract length was two years. On 14 October 2020, Tsui left the club after his club's withdrawal from the HKPL in the new season.

On 28 November 2020, Tsui signed with Lee Man.

International career
On 31 August 2017, Tsui made his international debut for Hong Kong in the match against Singapore in a friendly match.

Career statistics

Club
As of match played 28 September 2019.

Notes

International

Honours

International
Hong Kong
 Guangdong-Hong Kong Cup: 2018

References

External links

1997 births
Living people
Hong Kong footballers
Association football defenders
Hong Kong Premier League players
China League One players
Hong Kong Rangers FC players
Dreams Sports Club players
Meizhou Hakka F.C. players
R&F (Hong Kong) players
Lee Man FC players
Hong Kong expatriate sportspeople in China
Footballers at the 2018 Asian Games
Asian Games competitors for Hong Kong

Hong Kong expatriate footballers
Expatriate footballers in China